Petro Mykolayovych Stasyuk (born 24 February 1995) is a Ukrainian professional footballer who plays as a defender for Ukrainian side Mariupol.

Career
Born in Ovidiopol Raion, Stasyuk is a product of the local Odesa Oblast academies as well as the Skala Morshyn youth system.

Playing for FC Mynai, Stasyuk was recognized by the PFL as a player of the month for July 2020.

After playing for various Ukrainian Second League and Ukrainian First League teams, he signed a three-year deal with the Ukrainian Premier League FC Mariupol in August 2020.

References

External links
 
 

1995 births
Living people
Ukrainian footballers
Association football defenders
FC Skala Stryi (2004) players
FC Balkany Zorya players
FC Zhemchuzhyna Odesa players
FC Mynai players
FC Mariupol players
Ukrainian Premier League players
Ukrainian First League players
Ukrainian Second League players
Sportspeople from Odesa Oblast